Artiora is a genus of moths in the family Geometridae.

Species
 Artiora evonymaria (Denis & Schiffermüller, 1775)

References
 Artiora at Markku Savela's Lepidoptera and Some Other Life Forms

Ennominae
Geometridae genera